Miha Lokar (born 10 September 1935) is a Slovenian former basketball player. He represented the Yugoslavia national basketball team internationally. Lokar was a member of the Yugoslavia national team that competed in the men's tournament at the 1960 Summer Olympics.

References

1935 births
Living people
Basketball players at the 1960 Summer Olympics
KK Olimpija players
Olympic basketball players of Yugoslavia
Slovenian men's basketball players
Sportspeople from Celje
Yugoslav men's basketball players